Padfield is an English surname. Notable people with the surname include:

Nicholas Padfield (born 1947), English barrister and judge
Nicola Padfield (born 1955), English barrister and legal scholar
Peter Padfield (1932–2022), British writer, historian and journalist

English-language surnames